RoboForm is a password manager, a class of software that allows users to have secure, unique passwords for every website accessed.  It is amongst the older password managers on the market, developed by US company Siber Systems, distributed as a freemium with in subscription plan, available on macOS, Windows, iOS and Android and as a plugin for web browsers.

Overview 
Siber Systems is a company founded in 1995 by Vadim Maslov with headquarter in Fairfax in US. Company was founded to capitalize on research into text parsing, compilation and transformation and produce useful, commercially-viable technologies. They released RoboForm as their first consumer product in 1999.

RoboForm was initially a form-filling utility and was further developed into a full-fledged password manager, then delivered with password generator, password capturer, password importer, multi-factor authentication and secure password sharing.  

First business version was released in 2009. In 2010 was introduced premium cross-platform subscription service for individuals and in 2015, was launched RoboForm as a software as a service solution (SaaS). Freemium model is available from 2017.

See also 

 List of password managers

References 

Password managers
Utilities for Windows